50 Central is an American sketch comedy television series hosted by 50 Cent. The series premiered on BET on September 27, 2017.

Episodes

References

External links
 

2010s American sketch comedy television series
2010s American variety television series
2017 American television series debuts
2017 American television series endings
English-language television shows
BET original programming
Television series by G-Unit Films and Television Inc.